Bilham Sand Pits is a 0.2 hectare (0.1 acre) geological site of Special Scientific Interest in South Yorkshire. The site was notified in 1987.

See also
List of Sites of Special Scientific Interest in South Yorkshire

References
 Bilham Sand Pits Natural England. Retrieved on 2009-02-12

Sites of Special Scientific Interest notified in 1987
Sites of Special Scientific Interest in South Yorkshire
South Yorkshire